is a Japanese actor, voice actor and narrator from Nishitōkyō, Tokyo. His sons, Hirofumi Nojima and Kenji Nojima, are voice actors and his other son Satoshi is a nature writer. He was formerly affiliated with Tokyo Actor's Consumer's Cooperative Society and is attached to Sigma Seven as of 2016. He is most known for the roles of Saga in Saint Seiya and the Japanese voice of KITT in Knight Rider.

Filmography

Television animation
Akakichi no Eleven (1970) – Saizou Yashima
Andersen Stories (1971) - Prince (The Little Mermaid)
Sarutobi Ecchan (1971) – Taihei Tenka
Gasshin Sentai Mechander Robo (1977) – Ryousuke Shikishima
Invincible Super Man Zambot 3 (1977) – Ichitarō Jin
Rascal the Raccoon (1977) – Carl
Shin Kyojin no Hoshi (1977) – Koichi Tabuchi
Kagaku Bōkentai Tansar 5 (1979) – Daichi Akai
The Rose of Versailles (1979) – Bernard Châtelet
Dogtanian and the Three Muskehounds (1981) – Aramis; Athos
Queen Millennia (1981) -- Colonel Geran; Genjirou Amamori; Man in Trench Coat
Six God Combination Godmars (1981) – Gasshu
Ochamegami Monogatari Korokoro Poron (1982) – Apollon
 Akū Daisakusen Srungle (1983) – Captain Jance
Armored Trooper Votoms (1983) – Aaron Schmittel
Iga no Kabamaru (1983) – Maijima
Fushigi na Koala Blinky (1984) – Erimaki-Tokage
Katri, Girl of the Meadows (1984) – Teemu Räikkölä
Magical Fairy Persia (1984) – Hideki Hayami
Saint Seiya (1986) – Gemini Saga (good side)
Rurouni Kenshin (1996) – Han'nya
Turn A Gundam (1999) – Sid Munzer
Mao-chan (2002) – Rikushirō Onigawara
Angel Heart (2005) – Makimura's father
Emma: A Victorian Romance (2005) – Richard Jones
Le Chevalier D'Eon (2006) – D'Eon Elder
Darker than Black (2007) – Decade
Shigofumi: Letters from the Departed (2008) – Tatsumi Nojima
Time of Eve (2008) – Atsurou Masaki (ONA and film)
Shakugan no Shana III Final (2011) – Samuel Demantius
Eureka Seven AO (2012) – Alexander Boyd
Yuyushiki (2013) – God (Snowflake) (ep. 6)
Kill la Kill (2013) – Mitsuzō Soroi
Nobunaga Concerto (2014) – Azai Hisamasa
Invaders of the Rokujyōma!? (2014) – Yūichirō Satomi
Ajin: Demi-Human (2016) – Hashiguchi
Tomica Kizuna Mode Combine Earth Granner (2021) – White Eagle
Blade Runner: Black Lotus (2021) – Doctor M

OVA
Legend of the Galactic Heroes (2000) – Chun Wu Chen

Theatrical animation
Detective Conan: The Private Eyes' Requiem (2006) – Souichiro Miyama

Tokusatsu
Inazuman Flash (????) – Magnet Desper
Akumaizer 3 (????) – Kasadoler, Komainurn
Himitsu Sentai Gorenger (1975) – Diamond Masked、Bird (ep. 43), Talon Masked (ep. 47)
Tensou Sentai Goseiger (2010) – Zuteramedorop Alien Abauta of the Research (ep. 7)

Games
Final Fantasy XII (2006) – Marquis Halim Ondore IV
Wild Arms: The 4th Detonator (2005) – Augst
Final Fantasy XIV:Shadowbringers (2019) – Ran'Jit

Drama CDs
Aisaresugite Kodoku series 2: Itoshisugita Shifuku (????) – Masaaki Izu
Answer Series 1: Answer (????) – Kamata-buchou

Dubbing

Live-action
Robert De Niro
The Intern – Ben Whittaker
Joy – Rudy Mangano
Dirty Grandpa – Richard Kelly
Joker – Murray Franklin
The Admiral: Roaring Currents – Takatora Tōdō (Kim Myung-gon)
The Alamo – Davy Crockett (Billy Bob Thornton)
American Graffiti (1984 TBS edition) – Curt Henderson (Richard Dreyfuss)
America's Sweethearts – Lee Phillips (Billy Crystal)
A Better Tomorrow – Ken (Kenneth Tsang)
Beverly Hills Cop (1988 TV Asahi edition) – Billy Rosewood (Judge Reinhold)
The Big Brawl – Robert
Blood & Treasure – Jay Reece (John Larroquette)
The Bodyguard – Old Man #3 (Tsui Hark)
Chain Reaction (1999 TV Asahi edition) – FBI Agent Doyle (Kevin Dunn)
Chariots of Fire (1985 TBS edition) – Harold Abrahams (Ben Cross)
Cliffhanger (1997 NTV edition) – Hal Tucker (Michael Rooker)
CSI: Crime Scene Investigation – Gil Grissom (William Petersen)
The Curse of La Llorona – Father Perez (Tony Amendola)
Dying Young – Gordon (Vincent D'Onofrio)
Emma – Mr. Woodhouse (Bill Nighy)
Eternal Sunshine of the Spotless Mind – Howard Mierzwiak (Tom Wilkinson)
Fast Times at Ridgemont High – Brad Hamilton (Judge Reinhold)
Final Destination – Agent Weine (Daniel Roebuck)
Ghostbusters – Ed Mulgrave (Ed Begley Jr.)
Ghostbusters II (1998 TV Asahi edition) – Peter Venkman (Bill Murray)
Glengarry Glen Ross – John Williamson (Kevin Spacey)
The Great Escape II: The Untold Story – Lieutenant Mike Corey (Anthony Denison)
Home Alone (1998 TV Asahi edition) – Peter (John Heard)
Home Alone: The Holiday Heist – Sinclair (Malcolm McDowell)
Iron Sky: The Coming Race – Wolfgang Kortzfleisch / Vril Adolf Hitler (Udo Kier)
Jappeloup (2021 BS TV Tokyo edition) – Serge Durand (Daniel Auteuil)
Jason Bourne (2022 BS Tokyo edition) – Richard Webb (Gregg Henry)
King's War – Liu Bang (Chen Daoming)
Knight Rider – KITT
Last Vegas – Sam Harris (Kevin Kline)
The Long Kiss Goodnight – Luke Daedalus (David Morse)
Lost Girl – Fitzpatrick "Trick" McCorrigan (Rick Howland)
Master with Cracked Fingers – Lung's Father (Tien Feng)
The Mermaid – Uncle Rich (Tsui Hark)
Morgan – Dr. Alan Shapiro (Paul Giamatti)
Next Stop, Greenwich Village - Robert (Christopher Walken)
The Platform – Trimagasi (Zorion Eguileor)
Pleasantville – Big Bob (J. T. Walsh)
Project A – Inspector Hong Tin-Tzu (Yuen Biao)
Rear Window (2012 Blu-Ray edition) – Tom J. Doyle (Wendell Corey)
The Recruit – Dennis Slayne (Karl Pruner)
Red Heat (1990 TV Asahi edition) – Lieutenant Charlie Stobbs (Larry Fishburne)
Rush Hour 2 – Ricky Tan (John Lone)
Safe House (2018 BS Japan edition) – Harlan Whitford (Sam Shepard)
Seven Golden Men Strike Again (1975 TV Asahi edition) – Aldo (Gabriele Tinti)
Spy Game – Chuck Harker (Stephen Dillane)
Stand by Me – Gordie Lachance (adult) (Richard Dreyfuss)
Taboo – Brace (David Hayman)
Taxi Driver (1981 TBS edition) – Tom (Albert Brooks)
The Thing – Nauls (T. K. Carter)
Top Gun (2005 DVD edition) – CDR Mike "Viper" Metcalf (Tom Skerritt)
True Memoirs of an International Assassin (Netflix edition) – Amos (Ron Rifkin)
U.S. Marshals (2001 TV Asahi/2004 TV Tokyo editions) – Cosmo Renfro (Joe Pantoliano)
Valdez Is Coming – R.L. Davis (Richard Jordan)
West Side Story (1979 TBS edition) – A-Rab (David Winters)
What Dreams May Come – Dr. Christopher James Nielsen (Robin Williams)
Wheels on Meals – Henry Matt (Herb Edelman)
Wild Card – Baby (Stanley Tucci)
X-Men (2003 TV Asahi edition) – Senator Robert Kelly (Bruce Davison)
X2 (2006 TV Asahi edition) – Senator Robert Kelly (Bruce Davison)
X-Men Origins: Wolverine – William Stryker (Danny Huston)
The Young Master – Master Tien (Tien Feng)
Youth – Mick Boyle (Harvey Keitel)
Zhong Kui: Snow Girl and the Dark Crystal – Zhang Diaoxian (Winston Chao)

Animation
Luca – Tommaso
Robots – Crank Casey
A Turtle's Tale: Sammy's Adventures – Grandpa Sammy

References

External links
Official agency profile 

1945 births
Living people
Japanese male video game actors
Japanese male voice actors
Male voice actors from Tokyo Metropolis
People from Nishitōkyō, Tokyo
Sigma Seven voice actors
Tokyo Actor's Consumer's Cooperative Society voice actors
20th-century Japanese male actors
21st-century Japanese male actors